Peio Goikoetxea Goiogana (born 14 February 1992) is a Spanish cyclist, who currently rides for UCI ProTeam . He won stage 4 of the Volta a Portugal do Futuro in 2014.

Major results
2014
 1st Stage 4 Volta a Portugal do Futuro
2022
 1st  Aggressive rider classification, Tour of Oman

References

External links

1992 births
Living people
Spanish male cyclists
Cyclists from the Basque Country (autonomous community)
People from Ermua
Sportspeople from Biscay